VIVO! Cluj-Napoca is a shopping mall located in Cluj-Napoca, Romania which opened on October 12, 2007, having the name of Polus Center Cluj. At the time of its completion it was the first shopping mall in Cluj-Napoca. It took 15 months to build Polus Center, and for nine months the construction site was also the biggest archaeological site in Romania. Among the finds was the tomb of a Gepid princess and a 3300-year-old tomb of a pair of lovers.

Current stores include Zara, Bershka, Pull&Bear, Aldo, InMedio, Intersport, Piazza Italia, Kenvelo, New Yorker, Media Galaxy, Sony, Accessorize, Debenhams and Marks & Spencer, as well as an 8,000 square meters Carrefour hypermarket and a pet-shop. The centre also includes a paintball court, a skating rink, a karting circuit, a football pitch and several cinemas, as well as playgrounds for children. Polus also houses six bank agencies and a post office, as well as a number of restaurants.

In 2016, Polus Center Cluj was rebranded as VIVO! Cluj-Napoca by its new owners Immofinanz.

References

External links

 Former official site

Shopping malls in Cluj-Napoca